The 2022–23 NBL season will be the 45th season of the National Basketball League since its establishment in 1979. A total of ten teams contested in the 2022–23 season.

Australian broadcast rights to the season are held by ESPN in the second season of a three-year deal. All games are available live on ESPN and the streaming platform Kayo Sports. Network 10 will broadcast two Sunday afternoon games on 10 Peach and 10 Play. In New Zealand, Sky Sport continue as the official league broadcaster.

The 2022–23 season saw a return to the traditional October start after two straight condensed seasons due to the COVID-19 pandemic.

Teams
All ten teams from the 2021–22 NBL season continued on in 2022–23. The New Zealand Breakers returned to a regular home-and-away schedule after spending the majority of the previous two seasons based in Australia due to Covid-related travel restrictions.

Stadiums and locations

Personnel and sponsorship

Player transactions 
Free agency began on 20 May 2022, due to the late finish of the 2021–22 season which had been delayed due to COVID-19 pandemic.

Head coaching transactions

Pre-season 

The pre-season games began on 9 August 2022, and ran until 6 October 2022.

The pre-season also featured the Adelaide 36ers playing two NBA teams in the United States, marking the fourth NBLxNBA tour.

Blitz ladder 
The 2022 NBL Blitz ran from 16 to 23 September with all ten teams competing. Darwin, Northern Territory will host the tournament.

Regular season 
The regular season will begin on 1 October 2022. It will consist of 140 games spread across 18 rounds, with the final game being played on 5 February 2023. 

On 30 January 2023, Sydney Kings claimed their 7th regular season championship.

Round 1

Round 2

Round 3

Round 4

Round 5

Round 6

Round 7

Round 8

Round 9

Round 10

Round 11

Round 12

Round 13

Round 14

Round 15

Round 16

Round 17

Round 18

Ladder 

The NBL tie-breaker system as outlined in the NBL Rules and Regulations states that in the case of an identical win–loss record, the overall points percentage will determine order of seeding.

Ladder progression

Finals 

The 2023 NBL Finals will be played in February and March 2023, consisting of three play-in games, two best-of-three semifinal series and the best-of-five Grand Final series. In the semifinals, the higher seed hosts the first and third games. In the Grand Final, the higher seed hosts the first, third and fifth games. This will be the first season the league will introduce play-in games.

The top two seeds in the regular season will automatically qualify to the semifinals. Teams ranked three to six will compete in the play-in tournament. The third seed will play the fourth seed for third spot and the loser will play the winner of fifth or sixth for the fourth seed.

Playoff bracket

Awards

Pre-season 
 Loggins-Bruton Cup: Adelaide 36ers
 Most Valuable Player (Ray Borner Medal): Jack McVeigh (Tasmania JackJumpers)

Regular season

Awards Night 
 Most Valuable Player (Andrew Gaze Trophy): Xavier Cooks (Sydney Kings)
 Next Generation Award: Sam Waardenburg (Cairns Taipans)
 Best Defensive Player (Damian Martin Trophy): Antonius Cleveland (Adelaide 36ers)
 Best Sixth Man: Barry Brown Jr. (New Zealand Breakers)
 Most Improved Player: Keanu Pinder (Cairns Taipans)
 Fans MVP: Kai Sotto (Adelaide 36ers)
 Coach of the Year (Lindsay Gaze Trophy): Adam Forde (Cairns Taipans)
 Executive of the Year: Mark Beecroft (Cairns Taipans)
 Referee of the Year: Vaughan Mayberry
 GameTime by Kmart: Reuben Te Rangi (S.E. Melbourne Phoenix)
 All-NBL First Team: 
 Mitch Creek (S.E. Melbourne Phoenix)
 Xavier Cooks (Sydney Kings)
 Bryce Cotton (Perth Wildcats)
 Derrick Walton (Sydney Kings)
 Milton Doyle (Tasmania JackJumpers)
 All-NBL Second Team: 
 Keanu Pinder (Cairns Taipans)
 Dererk Pardon (New Zealand Breakers)
 Barry Brown Jr. (New Zealand Breakers)
 D. J. Hogg (Cairns Taipans)
 Chris Goulding (Melbourne United)

Post season 
 Grand Final Series MVP (Larry Sengstock Medal): Derrick Walton (Sydney Kings)
 NBL Chamipons: Sydney Kings

References

External links

 
Australia, NBL
2022–23 in Australian basketball
2022 in New Zealand basketball
2023 in New Zealand basketball